Margaret Thomson Janvier (1844 – 1913) was an American poet and author of children's literature who published under the pseudonym Margaret Vandegrift.

Biography
Janvier was born in New Orleans, Louisiana, to Francis de Haes Janvier and Emma (Newbold) Janvier. Her brother was the writer Thomas Allibone Janvier. She was initially educated at home and in the public school system before, in 1859, entering the Moravian Female Seminary in Bethlehem, Pennsylvania. She lived most of her adult life in Moorestown, New Jersey.

Beginning around 1880, Janvier published collections of poetry, adventure novels, short stories, and fairy tales for young readers. Many of her adventure tales featured plucky protagonists — often girls — overcoming difficulties ranging from financial destitution to the death of a parent. Critics of the era praised her as "a most charming entertainer of children". E. B. Bensell illustrated two of her books.

In addition to publishing stand-alone books, Janvier wrote for popular periodicals such as St. Nicholas Magazine, Harper's Young People, and Century Magazine. One of her poems, "Little Wild Baby", which implied a mixed-race relationship between a white man and a woman of color, was rejected by major literary periodicals of its day.

Selected publications
 Clover Beach (1880)
 Under the Dog Star (1881)
 Holidays at Home (1882)
 The Queen's Body Guard (1883)
 The Absent-Minded Fairy, and Other Verses (1884, illustrated by E. B. Bensell)
 Doris and Theodora (1884)
 Little Bell and Other Stories (1884, illustrated by E. B. Bensell)
 Rose Raymond's Wards (1885)
 Ways and Means (1886)
 The Dead Doll, and Other Verses (1888)
 Little Helpers (1888)
 Umbrellas to Mend (1905)

References

External links
 Little Helpers — at the Internet Archive
 The Queen's Body Guard — at the Internet Archive

1844 births
1913 deaths
American children's writers
19th-century American women writers
19th-century American writers
American women poets
American women children's writers